The 2010 Girls' Youth NORCECA Volleyball Championship was the seventh edition of the bi-annual Women's Junior NORCECA Volleyball Championship, played by ten countries from July 4–12, 2010 in Tijuana, Mexico. The United States defeated the Dominican Republic and qualified for the 2011 Women's Junior World Championship. The American Jane Croson won the tournament MVP.

Competing Nations

Pool standing procedure
Match won: 2 points
Match lost: 1 point
Match forfeited: 0 point
In case of tie, the teams were classified according to the following criteria:
points ratio and sets ratio

First round
 All times are PST, Pacific Standard Time (UTC−08:00)

Group A

|}

|}

Group B

|}

|}

Group C

|}

|}

Final round

Championship bracket

Classification 7/10

|}

Quarterfinals

|}

Classifications 7-8 & 9-10

|}

Semifinals

|}

5th place match

|}

3rd place match

|}

Final

|}

Final standing

Individual awards

Most Valuable Player

Best Scorer

Best Spiker

Best Blocker

Best Server

Best Digger

Best Setter

Best Receiver

Best Libero

References

External links
 NORCECA.net
Regulations

Women's NORCECA Volleyball Championship
NORCECA
Women's Junior NORCECA Volleyball Championship
International volleyball competitions hosted by Mexico
Sports in Tijuana
Volleyball in Mexico
Sports competitions in Baja California